Vámonos Pa'l Río (Eng.: Let's Go To The River) is the title of a studio album released by norteño music band Los Pikadientes de Caborca. This album became their first number-one set on the Billboard Top Latin Albums. It received a nomination for Best Regional Mexican Album at the Grammy Awards of 2009.

Track listing
The track listing from Billboard.com

Sales and certifications

References

2008 debut albums
Los Pikadientes de Caborca albums